Charumati (Brahmi: 𑀘𑀸 𑀭𑀼𑀼 𑀫𑀓𑀻), sometimes called Charumitra, was a daughter of Indian emperor Ashoka through a concubine and the adopted daughter of his wife, Queen Asandhimitra. She was trained in nursing by her. She was married to a Nepalese prince Devapala Kshatriya in Kathmandu. She is credited to have founded the monastery of Chabahil (called Charumati Vihara), which is one of the oldest Buddhist monastery of Nepal. She is believed to have taken care of her father in his last years of life and accompanied him through his Buddhist pilgrimage along with Upagupta. 

While scripture had described her and emperor Ashoka visiting Nepal, no archaeological evidences were present till 2003. In 2003, while restoring Dhando chaitya, archaeologists discovered a brick bearing inscriptions with her name. The upper face is inscribed with Cha Ru Wa Ti in Brahmi, and with  Cha Ru Wa Ti Dhande / He Tu Pra Bha in Bhujimol script. The brick measures 35.5cm x 23cm x 7cm and weighs 8.6kg.

References

See also
 List of Stupas in Nepal
 Buddhism
 Ashoka
 Chabahil

Nepalese royalty
Mauryan dynasty
4th-century Nepalese people
Daughters of emperors